Valampuri John was a Tamil writer, orator and former Rajya Sabha member of India.

He was born in Uvari village in Tirunelveli district, he started his career as a lawyer and activist of the Dravida Munnetra Kazhagam (DMK).
Later, he joined the All-India Anna Dravida Munnetra Kazhagam (AIADMK). He also associated himself with the erstwhile Tamil Maanila Congress founded by the late G.K. Moopanar in 1996. 
He had authored several books on different subjects including literature, politics and Siddha medicine.
He edited "Thaai", a Tamil periodical, launched by the late Chief Minister, M. G. Ramachandran. In 1992 he completed his dissertation 
"Prof.Ruthnaswamy - A Parliamentarian" to Pachaiyappa's College in for the doctorate degree in History and got his PhD. Along with his law degree he had several Master's degrees too.

He was elected to Rajya Sabha in 1974 and 1984. He became a member of the then Legislative Council in 1983.

He was survived by his wife, four daughters and son.

He has also directed a film called Adhu Antha Kaalam (1988).

Filmography
Adhu Antha Kaalam (1988) (director)

Books
Vanakkam - Talks about his working experience between MGR, Jayalalitha

References

External links
 

1946 births
2005 deaths
People from Tirunelveli district
Tamil writers
Dravida Munnetra Kazhagam politicians
Siddha medicine
Tamil film directors